ADODB may refer to:
ActiveX Data Objects, a Microsoft API for data access
ADOdb, a database abstraction library for PHP